Cosmești is a commune in Galați County, Western Moldavia, Romania with a population of 5,196 people. It is composed of six villages: Băltăreți, Cosmești, Cosmeștii-Vale, Furcenii Noi, Furcenii Vechi, and Satu Nou.

The commune lies on the Moldavian Plateau, on the banks of the Siret River. It is located in the western part of the county, on the border with Vrancea County.

Natives
 Ion Bîrlădeanu (born 1958), sprint kayaker 
 Dumitru Dămăceanu (1896–1978), army officer in World War II, who played a predominant role in the 1944 Romanian coup d'état.

References

Communes in Galați County
Localities in Western Moldavia